The Wonder of You is a compilation album by American singer Elvis Presley (1935–77). It was released on October 21, 2016 by RCA Records and Legacy Recordings. The album features archival vocal recordings of Elvis accompanied by new orchestral arrangements by the Royal Philharmonic Orchestra, recorded at the Abbey Road Studios. It also features a duet with German singer Helene Fischer.

It is the follow-up album to If I Can Dream (2015), which was a commercial success, selling 1.6 million copies worldwide. Elvis's ex-wife Priscilla Presley has said of The Wonder of You: "Elvis always loved the great, operatic vocalists. We often talked about his interest in recording material that allowed him to perform in that space. It's exciting to hear him on these recordings, performing with the world-class Royal Philharmonic Orchestra via the magic of Abbey Road Studios. He would have loved these performances and I'm very happy that we were able to make this dream come true for Elvis and his fans."

Commercial performance
The album debuted at #1 on the UK Albums Chart earning a BPI Silver award in its debut week with sales of 63,500. The following 22 weeks, the last 4  non consecutively,  it registered, inter alia,  weekly  sales of 35,456, 28,590, 29,647, 32,261, 44,446, 54,011, 60,979, 73,461, 35,915, 15,983, 9,575, 3,540, 1,900, 1,300 and 1,000 thus totalling sales of 505,000 units while landing at #2, #3, #5, #5, #3, #4, #4, #3, #3, #4, #7, #17,  #32, #48,  #61, #70, #96,  #65,  #58, #79 and #89  respectively, and earning a BPI Gold and Platinum certification. It is Elvis' 13th UK number-one album, making him the solo artist with most UK number-one albums (and overall only behind The Beatles with 15 number-one albums). Elvis also extended the record for most UK top 10 albums, with The Wonder of You becoming his 52nd top 10 album.  It became the year's 5th top selling album, and the biggest seller by a US  artist, the top four being Adele's 25, Coldplay's A Head Full of Dreams, Justin Bieber's Purpose, and Michael Ball and Alfie Boe's Together (three UK artists and a Canadian). Finally, it was also the #2 album released in the UK in 2016, after Together and by extension, the top selling album released in 2016 by a non-UK artist. In early 2018, it was announced that the album also made the list of the top 100 selling albums of 2017, at #84, with yearly sales of 84,000, thus totalling 542,250 units since its initial UK release back in 2016.

In the United States, the album debuted at #1 on the Billboard Classical Chart, making it Presley's second of three stays at the top on that chart, after If I Can Dream and before Christmas with Elvis and the RPO, the latter entering at #1 on the chart on 28 October 2017.  It has thus far remained inside that chart's Top 20 for 25 weeks.

As of September 2017, the album had sold 800,000 copies worldwide according to Legacy Recordings.

Track listing 

Notes
The duet version of "Just Pretend" with Helene Fischer is omitted from the UK version.
The album was also released as a two-disc version with If I Can Dream.

Charts

Weekly charts

Year-end charts

Certifications and sales

References 

2016 compilation albums
Elvis Presley compilation albums
Orchestral pop albums
Royal Philharmonic Orchestra albums
Albums produced by Nick Patrick (record producer)
Compilation albums published posthumously
Priscilla Presley